Omaha Public Schools (OPS) is the largest school district in the state of Nebraska, United States. This public school district serves a diverse community of about 52,000 students at over 80 elementary and secondary schools in Omaha. Its district offices are located in the former Tech High at 30th and Cuming Streets.

Within Douglas County the district includes much of Omaha. The district extends into parts of Sarpy County, where it includes portions of Bellevue.

Key personnel

Recent controversy

One City, One School District
On June 13, 2005, the Omaha Public Schools Board and Superintendent John Mackiel announced their intention to annex 25 schools within Omaha city limits to OPS. They are currently part of the Elkhorn Public Schools, Millard Public Schools and Ralston Public Schools districts. This announcement, based on three Nebraska statutes enacted in 1891 and 1947, is known as the "One City, One School District" plan.

This issue is highly controversial in Omaha. Supporters of the plan claim that a single school district is necessary to promote a cohesive Omaha community, ensure academic equity in all Omaha schools and prevent OPS from becoming locked into a declining property tax base. Opponents contend that Omaha-area residents should be able to choose from a number of school districts, and that the schools would become less efficient in one large school district. Discussions among the school districts have been unproductive; the issue figured prominently in the 2006 session of the Nebraska state legislature.

Split the District
The Nebraska legislature passed a bill (LB 1024) on April 13, 2006, that addresses the "One City, One School District" issues. The governor of Nebraska signed it later that day. It requires each metropolitan class city to have a "learning community" that consists of all of the school districts in the county where the city is located and any county that shares a border with the city. The learning community will be composed of voting representatives from each school district and will also include the superintendents of the districts as non-voting members. A learning community will be charged with helping to distribute property tax revenue more evenly throughout the school districts in its area.

In general, a learning community leaves the boundaries of school districts untouched. However, LB 1024 also calls for OPS to be broken into three separate school districts. The exact boundaries for three new Omaha school districts are to be chosen by the Omaha learning community. Their choices are limited by requirements of LB 1024 that each new district consist of contiguous high school attendance areas and include either two or three of the seven existing high schools. That allows about 20 ways to group the seven schools, depending on which adjacent high school attendance areas are grouped with the geographically most central area.

The three-district plan for OPS was proposed in amendment AM3142, introduced on the day the legislature first took up LB 1024. The suburban school districts reluctantly supported the three-district plan, seeing it as the most favorable to them of the bills proposed. The OPS leadership vehemently opposed the plan. AM3142 was approved on the day it was introduced by a counted vote of 33 to 6 with 10 senators not voting. Five days later a motion to reconsider AM3142 failed in a roll-call vote of 9 to 31 with 9 senators not voting. The roll call showed legislators from Omaha split six in favor of the three-district plan (Sens. Brashear, Brown, Chambers, Jensen, Pahls and Redfield) and five opposed (Sens. Bourne, Friend, Howard, Kruse and Synowiecki).

It is suspected that OPS may file a suit challenging the new law. On May 16, 2006, the National Association for the Advancement of Colored People (NAACP) filed a suit against the governor and other Nebraska state officials charging that LB 1024, originally proposed by state senator Ernie Chambers, "intentionally furthers racial segregation." The NAACP lawsuit argues that because Omaha has racially segregated residential patterns, subdivided school districts will also be racially segregated, contrary to United States law.

According to April 2006, information published by Associated Press, the current Omaha public school district has approximately 45,000 students classified as 46 percent white, 31 percent black, 20 percent Hispanic, and 3 percent Asian or American Indian. News reports indicate that division of the city of Omaha into three new school districts, as ordered in April, 2006, by the Nebraska legislature and including current Elkhorn, Millard and Ralston public schools, is often expected to result in black students concentrated in a North Omaha district, white students in West Omaha district, and non-English speaking students in a South Omaha district. However, the law does not mandate such a result. Within its requirements, new districts may be drawn in several different ways.

LB 641, approved on May 7th, 2007, repealed the requirement that the Omaha Public Schools district be broken up into three districts.

Schools

High schools

Middle schools

Elementary schools

Alternative/specialized schools

See also
Historical schools in North Omaha
Historical schools in East Omaha
Education in Omaha, Nebraska
Education in North Omaha

Notes and references

External links
 

 
School districts of Omaha, Nebraska
Education in Omaha, Nebraska
Government agencies with year of establishment missing
School districts established in 1854
Education in Douglas County, Nebraska
Education in Sarpy County, Nebraska